Xiang is the name of a king of the semi-legendary Xia dynasty who is said to have reigned during the 3rd millennium BC. He was the fifth king of the Xia dynasty.

Biography 
Xiang had been preceded on the throne of Xia by his father Zhong Kang, and before that by his uncle Tai Kang.

Reign according to the Bamboo Annals
Xiang got his throne in the year of Wuxu and set his capital in Shangqiu.

In the first year of his reign, he sent troops against the Huai Barbarians and Fei Barbarians (畎夷, aka Quanyi). In the third year, he sent troops to the Feng Barbarians and Huang Barbarians.

In his 7th year, "the hordes of Yu came to make their submission", while in the 8th year, the warlord Han Zhuo killed Hou Yi. Han Zhuo also sent his son Jiao against Ge.

In his 9th year, Xiang moved his court to Zhenguan.

In the 15th year, Xiang's vassal, Xiangshi duke of Shang, "prepared carriages and horses, and removed to Shangqiu".

In the 20th year, Han Zhuo conquered Ge. In the 26th year, Han Zhuo ordered his son Jiao to fight in Zhenguan. In the 27th year of Xiang's reign, Jiao attacked Xia at Wei in Zhenxun.

28th year of reign 
In the 28th year of Xiang's reign, Han Zhuo ordered his son Jiao to kill King Xiang. At that time, Xiang's wife, Queen Ji was pregnant. She escaped and hid in Youren. The prime minister of Xia, Mi, fled to Youge. Later, Ji gave birth to a boy named Shao Kang.

19 years later, Shao Kang, heir to the throne of Xia, went from Youren to Yu. In the following years, Shao Kang and Mi led the forces of Zhenxun and Zhenguan to fight against the renegade Han Zhuo. Shao Kang sent Ru Ai to fight Jiao in Guo, and Jiao was killed. He also sent his son Zishu to recover Ge. Finally, forty years after Xiang's death, Mi executed Han Zhuo.

Shao Kang returned in triumph to the Xia capital and took the throne, and all the former Xia vassals came to do homage.

Notes 

Xia dynasty kings
Ancient murdered monarchs
Assassinated Chinese politicians